The Parliament of Upper Canada was the legislature for Upper Canada. It was created when the old Province of Quebec was split into Upper Canada and Lower Canada by the Constitutional Act of 1791.

As in other Westminster-style legislatures, it consisted of three components:
The Crown of the United Kingdom, represented by the Lieutenant Governor of Upper Canada who was assisted by the Executive Council of Upper Canada
The Legislative Council of Upper Canada (the appointed upper house)
The Legislative Assembly of Upper Canada (the elected lower house)

Following the Rebellions of 1837 and Lord Durham's 1839 Report to the British Government, Upper Canada and Lower Canada were rejoined in 1841 to create the Province of Canada. The Parliament of Upper Canada was therewith replaced by the newly created Parliament of the United Province of Canada.

List of Parliaments
The Parliament was convened thirteen times in its history:
1st Parliament of Upper Canada 1792-1796
2nd Parliament of Upper Canada 1797-1800
3rd Parliament of Upper Canada 1801-1804
4th Parliament of Upper Canada 1805-1808
5th Parliament of Upper Canada 1808-1812
6th Parliament of Upper Canada 1812-1816
7th Parliament of Upper Canada 1817-1820
8th Parliament of Upper Canada 1821-1824
9th Parliament of Upper Canada 1825-1828
10th Parliament of Upper Canada 1829-1830
11th Parliament of Upper Canada 1831-1834
12th Parliament of Upper Canada 1835-1836
13th Parliament of Upper Canada 1837-1840

References

Upper Canada